"Pandemonium" (also known as "The Pandemonium Single") is a song by Killing Joke, released in 1994 by Butterfly Records as the third single from their 1994 studio album of the same name.

Release 

"Pandemonium" was released in July 1994 by Butterfly Records as the third single from the band's 1994 studio album of the same name. It peaked at No. 28 in the UK Singles Chart on 16 July 1994.

Track listing

Charts

References

External links 

 

1994 singles
Killing Joke songs
Songs written by Jaz Coleman
Songs written by Geordie Walker
Songs written by Youth (musician)
1994 songs